Sannahed is a locality situated in Kumla Municipality, Örebro County, Sweden with 417 inhabitants in 2010.

References

External links

Populated places in Örebro County
Populated places in Kumla Municipality